Tonga College is a Tongan secondary school, founded by the Tongan government in 1882. Its origination was a joint effort between King George Tupou I and Reverend Shirley Waldemar Baker who also both formed the Free Church of Tonga in 1885. The school is located in Nukuʻalofa, Tongatapu, Tonga.

Its total enrollment was 961 students in 2003.

References

External links 
 Website of Tonga College

1882 establishments in Tonga
Schools in Tonga